Halyzia is a genus in the ladybird family, Coccinellidae.

Identification 
The Halyzia sedecimguttata is identified by its orange color and 14-16 spots on its back.

Distribution 
Halyzia is concentrated in European deciduous forests. They can be found in the edges of woodlands or bushes.

Life cycle 
Halyzia, like many insects has an egg stage, a larval stage, a pupa stage and an adult stage. Once the female lays her eggs, they will hatch in 4-10 days.  Halyzia will molt many times before it becomes a full grown adult.

Behaviour 
Like moths, Halyzia is attracted to light. These Insects will be frequently found in moth traps.

Species 
Species within this genus include:
Halyzia feae Gorham, 1895 
Halyzia nepalensis Canepari, 2003 
Halyzia sanscrita Mulsant, 1853 
Halyzia sedecimguttata (Linnaeus, 1758)
Halyzia straminea (Hope in Gray, 1831) 
Halyzia tschitscherini Semenow, 1895

References

https://www.wildlifetrusts.org/wildlife-explorer/invertebrates/beetles/orange-ladybird
https://www.inaturalist.org/taxa/52881-Halyzia-sedecimguttata
https://www.theguardian.com/environment/gallery/2013/jul/22/ladybird-species-harlequin-uk-insects
https://www.ladybuglady.com/LadybugsFAQ.htm

Coccinellidae
Coccinellidae genera
Taxa named by Étienne Mulsant